Grassdale Farm is a historic home located at Spencer, Henry County, Virginia. It was built about 1860, and is a two-story, center-passage-plan frame dwelling with Greek Revival and Greek Revival style influences. Two-story ells have been added to the rear of the main section, creating an overall "U" form. Also on the property are a variety of contributing buildings and outbuildings including a kitchen, smokehouse, cook's house, log dwelling, and office / caretaker's house dated to the 19th century; and a garage, playhouse, poultry house, two barns, greenhouse, Mack Watkin's House, granary and corn crib, and Spencer Store and Post Office dated to the 1940s-1950s. Grassdale Farm was once owned by Thomas Jefferson Penn, who built Chinqua-Penn Plantation outside Reidsville, North Carolina, where the Penn tobacco-manufacturing interests were located.

It was listed on the National Register of Historic Places in 2002.

References

Houses on the National Register of Historic Places in Virginia
Greek Revival houses in Virginia
Italianate architecture in Virginia
Houses completed in 1860
Houses in Henry County, Virginia
National Register of Historic Places in Henry County, Virginia